"Because of You" is a song by Belgian singer Gustaph, released as a single on 13 January 2023. The song is scheduled to represent Belgium in the Eurovision Song Contest 2023 after winning Eurosong 2023, Belgium's national final for that year's Eurovision Song Contest.

Background 
In an interview with Eurovision fansite ESC Bubble, Gustaph compared both of his songs for Eurosong 2023, "The Nail" and "Because of You". In the interview, he described both songs as a call for celebrating freedom and "the joy to be yourself". Gustaph, who is a member of the LGBTQ+ community, said that his experiences of being in the community and wanting to be himself inspired both songs. However, he described "Because of You" as a lighter, "club anthem" song.

Eurovision Song Contest

Eurosong 2023 
Eurosong 2023 was the national final that was used to select Belgium's entry in the Eurovision Song Contest 2023. The competition consisted of five pre-recorded songclub shows that were broadcast between 9 and 13 January 2023, followed by a live final on 14 January 2023 where the winning song and artist were selected.

Seven artists were sought to compete in Eurosong. In the five songclub shows, the show featured each artist presenting their two candidate Eurovision songs in front of the six other artists, who provided commentary and feedback on the songs. Based on the feedback, the artist selected one of the two songs to proceed to the final. Gustaph presented his two songs, "The Nail" and "Because of You" on 12 January and 13 January, respectively. On 13 January, Gustaph revealed that he had chosen "Because of You" to take to the final of Eurosong 2023.

In the final, the winner was chosen by a combination of a jury vote and a public televote. Eleven jurors accounted for 50% of the vote, while the public decided the other 50%. "Because of You" earned 121 votes from the juries, earning the third jury spot overall. In the televote, "Because of You" earned 157 points, placing second overall in the televote, with a total of 278 points. When the full voting results were revealed, the song was revealed as the winner, beating televote favourite "Rollercoaster" by one point due to a lacklustre jury score for "Rollercoaster", which scored only 94 points, despite a televote score of 183 points. As a result, "Because of You" is scheduled to represent Belgium in the Eurovision Song Contest 2023.

At Eurovision 

Charts

References 

2023 songs
2023 singles
Eurovision songs of Belgium
Eurovision songs of 2023
LGBT-related songs